The Bladensburg Road Bridge is a bridge that carries U.S. Route 1 Alternate (US 1 Alt.; Bladensburg Road) over the Anacostia River between the communities of Colmar Manor and Bladensburg in the U.S. state of Maryland.

Bridges over the Anacostia River
Bridges in Prince George's County, Maryland
Road bridges in Maryland
Bridges of the United States Numbered Highway System
U.S. Route 1